Horse Shoe is an unincorporated community and census-designated place (CDP) in Henderson County, North Carolina, United States. Its ZIP code is 28742. As of the 2010 census, its population was 2,351.

The community took its name from a nearby meander in the French Broad River.

Geography
Horse Shoe is in western Henderson County, bordered to the north by the town of Mills River and to the west by unincorporated Etowah. The French Broad River runs through the center of the Horse Shoe community. U.S. Route 64 passes through Horse Shoe south of the river, and leads east  to Hendersonville, the county seat, and southwest through Etowah  to Brevard.

Demographics

Notable people
 Bil Dwyer, cartoonist and humorist (1907-1987)
 Cecil Gordon, race-car driver (1941-2012)

Notes

External links
Historic Hendersonville
Home of the Blue Ridge Institute for Medical Research (BRIMR).

Census-designated places in North Carolina
Census-designated places in Henderson County, North Carolina
Unincorporated communities in North Carolina
Unincorporated communities in Henderson County, North Carolina